John Carson Lennox (born 7 November 1943) is a Northern Irish mathematician, bioethicist and Christian apologist. He has written many books on religion, ethics, the relationship between science and faith (like his books, Has Science Buried God and Can Science Explain Everything), and has had numerous public debates with atheists including Richard Dawkins and Christopher Hitchens.

He retired from professorship where he specialised in group theory. He is Emeritus Professor of Mathematics at the University of Oxford and an Emeritus Fellow in Mathematics and Philosophy of Science at Green Templeton College, Oxford University. He is also an Associate Fellow of the Saïd Business School and a Senior Fellow at the Trinity Forum.

Early life
John Lennox was born on 7 November 1943 in Northern Ireland and brought up in Armagh where his father ran a store.
He attended The Royal School, Armagh, and went on to become Exhibitioner and Senior Scholar at Emmanuel College, Cambridge, where in 1962 he also attended the last lectures of C. S. Lewis on the poet John Donne. Lennox obtained Master of Arts and Doctor of Philosophy degrees at the University of Cambridge with the dissertation Centrality and Permutability in Soluble Groups (1970). He was awarded a Doctor of Science degree in mathematics by Cardiff University for his research. Lennox also holds a Doctor of Philosophy degree from the University of Oxford (by incorporation) and an M.A. degree in bioethics at the University of Surrey.

Career
Upon completing his doctorate, Lennox moved to Cardiff, Wales, becoming a reader in Mathematics at the University of Wales, Cardiff. Lennox also teaches science and religion in the University of Oxford. During his 29 years in Cardiff he spent a year at each of the universities of Würzburg, Freiburg (as an Alexander von Humboldt Fellow), and Vienna, and has lectured extensively in both Eastern and Western Europe, Russia and North America on mathematics, apologetics, and the exposition of scripture.

Lennox is the author of a number of books on the relations of science, religion, and ethics. His most recent works are: Being Truly Human (2018), Determined to Believe? (2018) and Against the Flow (2015). Titles being released early in 2019 include Finding Ultimate Reality, Joseph and Can science explain everything? He has published over 70 peer-reviewed articles on mathematics, co-authored two Oxford Mathematical Monographs, and worked as a translator of Russian mathematics.

He has spoken in many different countries, in conferences and as an academic fellow, including numerous trips to the former Soviet Union. On 14 March 2012 he presented an edition of the Lent Talks for BBC Radio Four. Lennox has also given lectures at the Veritas forum on topics such as the relationship between science and religion, the existence of God, doubt, and the problems of evil and suffering. Additionally, he is a Senior Fellow of The Trinity Forum, a Christian nonprofit organisation that develops leaders to make contributions to cultural renewal.

Debates

Lennox has been part of numerous public debates defending the Christian faith, including debates with Christopher Hitchens, Michael Shermer, Richard Dawkins, Lawrence Krauss,
Peter Atkins, Victor Stenger, Michael Tooley, Stephen Law, and Peter Singer.

On 3 October 2007, Lennox debated Richard Dawkins at the University of Alabama at Birmingham in Birmingham, Alabama on Dawkins's views expressed in his book, The God Delusion.
Lennox and Dawkins had a discussion in April 2008 at Trinity College, Oxford to expand upon topics left undeveloped during The God Delusion Debate.
On 9 August 2008, Lennox debated Christopher Hitchens at the Edinburgh International Festival in Edinburgh, Scotland, on the question of whether or not Europe should jettison its religious past and welcome the "New Atheism."
On 23 August 2008, Lennox debated Michael Shermer at the Wesley Conference Centre in Sydney, Australia, on the existence of God.
On 21 October 2008, Lennox again debated Dawkins at the Oxford University Museum of Natural History, the site of the 1860 Oxford evolution debate between Thomas Henry Huxley and Samuel Wilberforce. The debate was titled "Has Science Buried God?". The Spectator called the event "Huxley-Wilberforce, Round Two."
On 3 March 2009, Lennox debated Hitchens for the second time at Samford University in Birmingham, Alabama, on the question "Is God Great?" The debate addressed the validity of some of Hitchens' claims in his book God is Not Great.
On 20 July 2011, Lennox debated Peter Singer at the Melbourne Town Hall in Melbourne, Australia on the topic "Is There a God?"
In August 2021, Lennox was the chief guest for the prestigious Malhar Fest hosted by St. Xavier's College, Mumbai.

Personal life
Lennox speaks English, Russian, French, and German. He is married to Sally and has three children and 10 grandchildren. He has a brother named Gilbert Lennox, an elder in Glenabbey Church, Glengormley. The hymn writer and recording artist Kristyn Getty is John's niece, being Gilbert's daughter.

Works

References

External links

 
 Official website
 
 Interview with John Lennox by Tim Bearder, BBC Radio Oxford, 2008-10-16.
 Premier Christian Radio Radio debate on "Are we alone in the Universe?"

Living people
Mathematicians from Northern Ireland
Group theorists
Protestant philosophers
Christian apologists
Evangelicals from Northern Ireland
Critics of atheism
Fellows of Green Templeton College, Oxford
Fellows of Wycliffe Hall, Oxford
Alumni of Emmanuel College, Cambridge
Alumni of Cardiff University
Alumni of the University of Surrey
People educated at The Royal School, Armagh
Christianity and science
People from Armagh (city)
Place of birth missing (living people)
1943 births
Intelligent design advocates
British social commentators